Count László Hunyady de Kéthely (? – 4 July 1723, Cserenye) was a Hungarian nobleman and designate personalis from the prominent Hunyady family. His parents were Count Ferenc Hunyady de Kéthely (d. around 1690) and Erzsébet Varsányi de Varsány et Simony. He had one brother and five sisters. He married twice: his first wife was Baroness Mária Perényi de Perény and his second wife was  Anna Sándor de Szlavnicza. He had a son.

He served as clerk and secretary of Prince Pál Esterházy de Galántha, the Palatine of Hungary. Hunyady was appointed personalis (the representative of the King's person in the jurisdiction) in 1723 but he died before taking the office.

References 
László Markó: A magyar állam főméltóságai Szent Istvántól napjainkig. 2., bővített, javított kiadás. Budapest, 2006.

1723 deaths
Hungarian nobility
Hungarian politicians
Laszlo
Chief justices of Hungary
Year of birth unknown